Ali ibn Abi Talib (601-661 CE) was the fourth Sunni caliph and the first Shia Imam. Shia and some Sunni sources introduce Ali as the only person born inside the Ka'ba, the ancient shrine in Mecca which later became the most sacred site in Islam.

Event
Ali was born to Abu Talib and his wife Fatima bint Asad around 600 CE, some thirty years after the Year of the Elephant. Shia and some Sunni sources report that Ali was the only person born in Ka'ba, the ancient shrine in Mecca which later became the most sacred site in Islam. Some sources also contain miraculous descriptions of the incident. In particular, it is said that the wall of Ka'ba or its door slivered open as Fatima prayed there and shut close after she entered. She later emerged from Ka'ba with a baby boy, as people awaited her outside, unable to enter Ka'ba.

Historiography 
The canonical Shia Kitab al-Irshad and the Sunni The Meadows of Gold report that Ali was born inside Ka'ba. Shia sources are unanimous in this belief and regard the incident as unique to Ali and an indication of his high spiritual station. This account is also given by various Sunni authors, who regard birth in Ka'ba as a great distinction, though not unique to Ali. That Ali was born in Ka'ba is also the view of the recent Sunni scholars Shah Waliullah Dehlawi, Mu'min ibn Hasan al-Shablanji al-Shafi'i (nineteenth century), and Muhammad Sayyid Tantawy. The Shia author Razwi lists some Sunni authors with the same view:
 Al-Masudi in Murooj-udh-dhahab (Volume II)
 Muhammad ibn Talha el-Shafi'i in Matalib-us-saool
 El-Umari in Sharh ainia
 Halabi in Sira (Volume I)
 Sibt ibn al-Jauzi in Tadhkera khawasil ummah
 Ibn Sabbagh Maleki in Fusoolul mohimma
 Muhammad bin Yousuf Shafi'i in Kifayet al-Talib
 Mu'min bin Hasan al-Shablanji al-Shafi'i in Nurul absar
 Ibn Zahra in Ghiyathul ikhtisar
 Edvi in Nafhatul qudsia
 Abbas al-Aqqad in al-'Abqarriyet al-Imam Ali
 Muhammad Sayyid Tantawy in Min fada-il al-'ashrat al-mubashireen bil janna

References

Citations

Sources 

 
 
 
 
 

Ali
Ali ibn Abi Talib